Dasht-e Soltanabad-e Seh (also Romanized as Dasht-e Solţānābād-e Seh) is a village in Kuhestan Rural District, Rostaq District, Darab County, Fars Province, Iran. At the 2006 census, its population was 46, in 11 families.

References 

Populated places in Darab County